See Rosalia for namesakes
Rosalia (in Pisidia) was an ancient city in Pisidia, Asia Minor, in modern Turkey. Its location is unknown.

Ecclesiastical history 
None of its bishops are known, nor which archbishopric it was attached to.

By 1687, the diocese was nominally restored as the Roman Catholic titular bishopric of Rosalia; it was suppressed by decree of Propaganda Fide in 1894.

See also 
 List of Catholic titular sees

References

Sources 
 GCatholic
 Bibliography
 Konrad Eubel, Hierarchia Catholica Medii Aevi, vol. 5, p. 335; vol. 6, p. 358
 Gaetano Moroni, Dizionario di erudizione storico-ecclesiastica, vol. 59, p. 150

Catholic titular sees in Asia